Hige may refer to:
 Hige, a Japanese word for:
 Beard
 Whiskers
 Barbel
 Hige, a character from Japanese anime series Wolf's Rain.
 Hige, a Japanese rock band.